Jorja Fox (born 28 August 2003) is an English football player who plays as a defender for Brighton & Hove Albion on loan from Chelsea in the Women's Super League.

Club career 
Fox made her club debut with Chelsea in a 4–0 away victory against Aston Villa in the 2020–2021 campaign.

In the same season, she was handed her first start for the club in a 5–0 win over London City Lionesses.

She made her UEFA Women's Champions League debut, replacing Guro Reiten away to Servette on 9 November 2021.

On 6 January it was announced that Fox had joined FA Women's Championship side Charlton Athletic for the remainder of the 2021–2022 season.

References

External links 

2003 births
Living people
English women's footballers
England women's youth international footballers
Charlton Athletic W.F.C. players
Chelsea F.C. Women players
Women's association football defenders